Kuwait participated in the 1982 Asian Games in Delhi, India on November 19 to December 4, 1982. Kuwait ended the games at 7 overall medals including only 1 gold medal.

References

Nations at the 1982 Asian Games
1982
Asian Games